P46 or P-46 may refer to:

Vessels 
 , a corvette of the Argentine Navy
 , a submarine of the Royal Navy
 , a corvette of the Indian Navy

Other uses 
 Curtiss XP-46, an American prototype fighter aircraft
 Heckler & Koch UCP, a prototype pistol
 P46 road (Ukraine)
 Papyrus 46, a biblical manuscripts in Greek
 Phosphorus-46, an isotope of phosphorus
 P46, a Latvian state regional road